Oscar Brindley (November 21, 1885 – May 2, 1918) was a pioneering United States aviator, barnstormer, instructor and military pilot. He was trained at the Wright Brothers Flying School in Dayton Ohio.

Death
Having reached the rank of major in the Army (Signal Corps), Brindley was killed May 2, 1918, at Dayton Ohio with Col. Henry Damm while testing a new American-built Airco DH.4, the American version of the De Havilland DH-4.

See also
Wright Flying School

References

External links
 EarlyAviators.com

1885 births
1918 deaths
Accidental deaths in Ohio
Aviators killed in aviation accidents or incidents in the United States
Victims of aviation accidents or incidents in 1918